Ekuru is a very common native cuisine of the Yoruba people in Nigeria. It is usually prepared with peeled beans.

It is similar to moin-moin as both are made from peeled black-eyed peas or, occasionally, cowpeas. However, unlike moi-moi which is mixed with pepper and other ingredients before steaming, Ekuru is wrapped up in leaves or tin cans (similar to moi-moi) and steamed.

It is often prepared in the same way as ordinary moin moin but does not include any additional ingredients. It has a white color and tastes like stew. It goes well with solid pap (eko).

It is served with fried pepper stew and then mashed up with pepper stew. Some people enjoy the meal with fermented maize pudding (Ogi or Eko) it can also be served alongside (Eba) Cassava Pudding or Okro Soup.

The meal is native to people from South-Western Nigeria, predominantly from Osun State.

Ingredients 
The ingredients mentioned below are ingredients need to prepare a good Ekuruingredients
Black eyed beans
vegetable oil(òróró)

For Stew 
Tomatoes stew
Onion(Àlùbósà)
Stock cube
Salt (iyo)
Habanero  pepper 
Nutmeg

In culture 
Ekuru features in several Yoruba myths, where it is cooked with glue in an attempt to stop a cabal of evil witches from moving.

Because of the meal's dry nature, the expression "He chokes me like ekuru" can be used to describe a tedious visitor.

References

External links
 Yuntunmian. Nigerianfoodtv.com.

Nigerian cuisine
Puddings
Yoruba cuisine
Steamed foods